The 1999 Grand Prix Telemar Rio 200 was the fifth round of the 1999 CART World Series Season, held on May 15, 1999, on the Autódromo Internacional Nelson Piquet in Rio de Janeiro, Brazil. Christian Fittipaldi won his first and only Pole Position of his career.

Report

Race 
The race was delayed due to rain, and the drivers had to wait for the track to dry out. On the second attempt to start, Juan Pablo Montoya dived past front-row starters Christian Fittipaldi and Dario Franchitti to take the lead. The trio quickly pulled away from the rest of the field with Franchitti taking second from Fittipaldi at the first round of pit stops, only for Fittipaldi to reverse the order a few laps later by passing Franchitti on the track. Neither, despite staying within two seconds of Montoya, were able to give a serious challenge to him, the Colombian taking his third successive win. The battle for second eventually went to Franchitti who beat Fittipaldi with a quicker second pitstop.

Classification

Race

Caution flags

Lap Leaders

Point standings after race

References 

Grand Prix Telemar Rio 200
Grand Prix Telemar Rio 200
Rio 200